Reticulocalbin-1 is a protein that in humans is encoded by the RCN1 gene.

Reticulocalbin 1 is a calcium-binding protein located in the lumen of the ER. The protein contains six conserved regions with similarity to a high affinity Ca(+2)-binding motif, the EF-hand. High conservation of amino acid residues outside of these motifs, in comparison to mouse reticulocalbin, is consistent with a possible biochemical function besides that of calcium binding.

References

Further reading

EF-hand-containing proteins